Eleutherodactylus amplinympha is a species of frog in the family Eleutherodactylidae. It is endemic to Dominica, Lesser Antilles, where it occurs in the interior of the island at elevations of  asl. It is locally known as the gounouj.

Eleutherodactylus amplinympha is a habitat generalist with a preference for higher elevation, slightly open rainforest. It is threatened by habitat loss in some areas.

References

amplinympha
Amphibians of the Caribbean
Endemic fauna of Dominica
Amphibians described in 1994
Taxonomy articles created by Polbot